Robert Harris Suggett (3 September 1911 – 28 October 1982) was an Australian politician.

Biography 
He was born in St Arnaud to draper George Suggett and Florence Alexandra Penberthy. He attended Scotch College and then worked for the Bank of New South Wales. He served in the Royal Australian Air Force during World War II as a wireless operator, and actively opposed bank nationalisation in 1947. In 1955, he was elected to the Victorian Legislative Assembly as the Liberal member for Moorabbin. He lost party endorsement in 1961 but was re-elected as an Independent Liberal, and was re-admitted to the party in 1964. In 1967 he moved to the seat of Bentleigh, which he held until he was defeated in 1979. Suggett died at East Bentleigh in 1982.

References

1911 births
1982 deaths
People from St Arnaud
Liberal Party of Australia members of the Parliament of Victoria
Independent members of the Parliament of Victoria
Members of the Victorian Legislative Assembly
20th-century Australian politicians
Royal Australian Air Force personnel of World War II
Royal Australian Air Force airmen
People educated at Scotch College, Melbourne
Australian bankers
Military personnel from Melbourne